The Britain-Burma Society is a society founded in 1957 under the distinguished patronage of Earl Mountbatten of Burma, Sir Hubert Rance (formerly Governor of Burma), Miss Dorothy Woodman, the Rt. Hon. Malcolm MacDonald, the Rt. Hon. Arthur Bottomley and others.

Affiliation
The Society aims to be politically neutral and has as its objective the fostering of friendship and understanding between British people and Burmese people, especially in exchange of cultural and social relations between the two countries.

Organisation
The Britain-Burma Society was founded in 1957 under the distinguished patronage of Earl Mountbatten of Burma, Sir Hubert Rance (formerly Governor of Burma), Dorothy Woodman, the Rt. Hon. Malcolm Macdonald, the Rt. Hon. Arthur Bottomley and others.

The Society's constitution states that "The Society shall be non-political and have as its object the fostering of friendship and understanding between British people interested in Burma (Myanmar) and Burmese people, especially the encouragement of cultural and social relations between the two countries." The Society is non profit making.

The Society usually holds seven meetings a year in London for members and their guests. The October meeting was traditionally a reception for newly arrived Burmese trainees and students at the start of the academic year in Britain, as the Society has always been concerned to make them feel at home in this country. During recent years however the October reception has become an opportunity for members to meet again after the summer break and to welcome new members. The remaining evening meetings are devoted to lectures, slide and film shows, and reports from recent visitors to Burma. Light refreshments are always served. There is often a very enjoyable Society boat trip on the river Thames in late summer.  In early 2013 the first Britain-Burma Society trip to Burma is planned.

Membership is open to all individuals or bodies interested in the aims of the Society.

External links

1957 establishments in the United Kingdom
Myanmar–United Kingdom relations
Organizations established in 1957
United Kingdom friendship associations